MT Pacific Cobalt is a Singaporean oil tanker built in 2020 and owned by Eastern Pacific Shipping. It is one of the first and largest ships to be installed with an onboard filtration and carbon capture system.

Description 
It has an identical sister ship named Pacific Gold.

History 
In May 2022, Eastern Pacific Shipping announced that it would be working with the Netherlands-based maritime carbon capture company Value Maritime to install prefabricated "Filtree" systems. The installation was finished in February 2023 after a seventeen-day construction period, and Pacific Cobalt steamed from Rotterdam to Venice shortly after the installation was completed.

References 

2020 ships
Merchant ships of Singapore
Carbon capture and storage
Oil tankers